Content-based image retrieval, also known as query by image content (QBIC) and content-based visual information retrieval (CBVIR), is the application of computer vision techniques to the image retrieval problem, that is, the problem of searching for digital images in large databases (see this survey for a scientific overview of the CBIR field). Content-based image retrieval is opposed to traditional concept-based approaches (see Concept-based image indexing).

"Content-based" means that the search analyzes the contents of the image rather than the metadata such as keywords, tags, or descriptions associated with the image. The term "content" in this context might refer to colors, shapes, textures, or any other information that can be derived from the image itself.  CBIR is desirable because searches that rely purely on metadata are dependent on annotation quality and completeness.

Having humans manually annotate images by entering keywords or metadata in a large database can be time-consuming and may not capture the keywords desired to describe the image.  The evaluation of the effectiveness of keyword image search is subjective and has not been well-defined.  In the same regard, CBIR systems have similar challenges in defining success. "Keywords also limit the scope of queries to the set of predetermined criteria." and, "having been set up" are less reliable than using the content itself.

History
The term "content-based image retrieval" seems to have originated in 1992 when it was used by Japanese Electrotechnical Laboratory engineer Toshikazu Kato to describe experiments into automatic retrieval of images from a database, based on the colors and shapes present. Since then, the term has been used to describe the process of retrieving desired images from a large collection on the basis of syntactical image features. The techniques, tools, and algorithms that are used originate from fields such as statistics, pattern recognition, signal processing, and computer vision.

- Query By Image Content
The earliest commercial CBIR system was developed by IBM and was called QBIC (Query By Image Content). Recent network- and graph-based approaches have presented a simple and attractive alternative to existing methods.

While the storing of multiple images as part of a single entity preceded the term BLOB (Binary Large OBject), the ability to fully search by content, rather than by description, had to await IBM's QBIC.

Technical progress
The interest in CBIR has grown because of the limitations inherent in metadata-based systems, as well as the large range of possible uses for efficient image retrieval. Textual information about images can be easily searched using existing technology, but this requires humans to manually describe each image in the database. This can be impractical for very large databases or for images that are generated automatically, e.g. those from surveillance cameras. It is also possible to miss images that use different synonyms in their descriptions. Systems based on categorizing images in semantic classes like "cat" as a subclass of "animal" can avoid the miscategorization problem, but will require more effort by a user to find images that might be "cats", but are only classified as an "animal".  Many standards have been developed to categorize images, but all still face scaling and miscategorization issues.

Initial CBIR systems were developed to search databases based on image color, texture, and shape properties.  After these systems were developed, the need for user-friendly interfaces became apparent.  Therefore, efforts in the CBIR field started to include human-centered design that tried to meet the needs of the user performing the search.  This typically means inclusion of: query methods that may allow descriptive semantics, queries that may involve user feedback, systems that may include machine learning, and systems that may understand user satisfaction levels.

Techniques
Many CBIR systems have been developed, but , the problem of retrieving images on the basis of their pixel content remains largely unsolved.

Different query techniques and implementations of CBIR make use of different types of user queries.

Query By Example
QBE (Query By Example) is a query technique that involves providing the CBIR system with an example image that it will then base its search upon.  The underlying search algorithms may vary depending on the application, but result images should all share common elements with the provided example.

Options for providing example images to the system include:
 A preexisting image may be supplied by the user or chosen from a random set.
 The user draws a rough approximation of the image they are looking for, for example with blobs of color or general shapes.

This query technique removes the difficulties that can arise when trying to describe images with words.

Semantic retrieval
Semantic retrieval starts with a user making a request like "find pictures of Abraham Lincoln". This type of open-ended task is very difficult for computers to perform - Lincoln may not always be facing the camera or in the same pose. Many CBIR systems therefore generally make use of lower-level features like texture, color, and shape.  These features are either used in combination with interfaces that allow easier input of the criteria or with databases that have already been trained to match features (such as faces, fingerprints, or shape matching).  However, in general, image retrieval requires human feedback in order to identify higher-level concepts.

Relevance feedback (human interaction)
Combining CBIR search techniques available with the wide range of potential users and their intent can be a difficult task.  An aspect of making CBIR successful relies entirely on the ability to understand the user intent.  CBIR systems can make use of relevance feedback, where the user progressively refines the search results by marking images in the results as "relevant", "not relevant", or "neutral" to the search query, then repeating the search with the new information.  Examples of this type of interface have been developed.

Iterative/machine learning
Machine learning and application of iterative techniques are becoming more common in CBIR.

Other query methods
Other query methods include browsing for example images, navigating customized/hierarchical categories, querying by image region (rather than the entire image), querying by multiple example images, querying by visual sketch, querying by direct specification of image features, and multimodal queries (e.g. combining touch, voice, etc.)

Content comparison using image distance measures
The most common method for comparing two images in content-based image retrieval (typically an example image and an image from the database) is using an image distance measure. An image distance measure compares the similarity of two images in various dimensions such as color, texture, shape, and others. For example, a distance of 0 signifies an exact match with the query, with respect to the dimensions that were considered. As one may intuitively gather, a value greater than 0 indicates various degrees of similarities between the images. Search results then can be sorted based on their distance to the queried image. Many measures of image distance (Similarity Models) have been developed.

Color
Computing distance measures based on color similarity is achieved by computing a color histogram for each image that identifies the proportion of pixels within an image holding specific values. Examining images based on the colors they contain is one of the most widely used techniques because it can be completed without regard to image size or orientation.  However, research has also attempted to segment color proportion by region and by spatial relationship among several color regions.

Texture
Texture measures look for visual patterns in images and how they are spatially defined.  Textures are represented by texels which are then placed into a number of sets, depending on how many textures are detected in the image.  These sets not only define the texture, but also where in the image the texture is located.

Texture is a difficult concept to represent. The identification of specific textures in an image is achieved primarily by modeling texture as a two-dimensional gray level variation. The relative brightness of pairs of pixels is computed such that degree of contrast, regularity, coarseness and directionality may be estimated. The problem is in identifying patterns of co-pixel variation and associating them with particular classes of textures such as silky, or rough.

Other methods of classifying textures include:
 Co-occurrence matrix
 Laws texture energy
 Wavelet transform
 Orthogonal transforms (discrete chebyshev moments)

Shape
Shape does not refer to the shape of an image but to the shape of a particular region that is being sought out.  Shapes will often be determined first applying segmentation or edge detection to an image.  Other methods use shape filters to identify given shapes of an image.  Shape descriptors may also need to be invariant to translation, rotation, and scale.

Some shape descriptors include:
 Fourier transform
 Moment invariant

Vulnerabilities, attacks and defenses 

Like other tasks in computer vision such as recognition and detection, recent neural network based retrieval algorithms are susceptible to adversarial attacks, both as candidate and the query attacks. It is shown that retrieved ranking could be dramatically altered with only small perturbations imperceptible to human beings. In addition, model-agnostic transferable adversarial examples are also possible, which enables black-box adversarial attacks on deep ranking systems without requiring access to their underlying implementations.

Conversely, the resistance to such attacks can be improved via adversarial defenses such as the Madry defense.

Image retrieval evaluation
Measures of image retrieval can be defined in terms of precision and recall.  However, there are other methods being considered.

Image retrieval in CBIR system simultaneously by different techniques
An image is retrieved in CBIR system by adopting several techniques simultaneously such as Integrating Pixel Cluster Indexing, histogram intersection and discrete wavelet transform methods.

Applications
Potential uses for CBIR include:
 Architectural and engineering design
 Art collections
 Crime prevention
 Geographical information and remote sensing systems
 Intellectual property
 Medical diagnosis
 Military
 Photograph archives
 Retail catalogs
 Nudity-detection filters
 Face Finding
 Textiles Industry

Commercial Systems that have been developed include:
 IBM's QBIC
 Virage's VIR Image Engine
 Excalibur's Image RetrievalWare
 VisualSEEk and WebSEEk
 Netra
 MARS
 Vhoto
 Pixolution

Experimental Systems include:
 MIT's Photobook
 Columbia University's WebSEEk
 Carnegie-Mellon University's Informedia
 iSearch - PICT

See also
Document classification
GazoPa
Image retrieval
List of CBIR engines
Macroglossa Visual Search
MPEG-7
Multimedia information retrieval
Multiple-instance learning
Nearest neighbor search
Learning to rank

References

Further reading

Relevant research papers
 Query by Image and Video Content: The QBIC System, (Flickner, 1995)
 Finding Naked People  (Fleck et al., 1996)
 Virage Video Engine, (Hampapur, 1997)
 Library-based Coding: a Representation for Efficient Video Compression and Retrieval, (Vasconcelos & Lippman, 1997)
 System for Screening Objectionable Images (Wang et al., 1998)
 Content-based Image Retrieval (JISC Technology Applications Programme Report 39) (Eakins & Graham 1999)
 Windsurf: Region-Based Image Retrieval Using Wavelets (Ardizzoni, Bartolini, and Patella, 1999)
 A Probabilistic Architecture for Content-based Image Retrieval, (Vasconcelos & Lippman, 2000)
 A Unifying View of Image Similarity, (Vasconcelos & Lippman, 2000)
 Next Generation Web Searches for Visual Content, (Lew, 2000)
 Image Indexing with Mixture Hierarchies, (Vasconcelos, 2001)
 SIMPLIcity: Semantics-Sensitive Integrated Matching for Picture Libraries (Wang, Li, and Wiederhold, 2001)
 A Conceptual Approach to Web Image Retrieval (Popescu and Grefenstette, 2008)
 FACERET: An Interactive Face Retrieval System Based on Self-Organizing Maps (Ruiz-del-Solar et al., 2002)
 Automatic Linguistic Indexing of Pictures by a Statistical Modeling Approach (Li and Wang, 2003)
 Video google: A text retrieval approach to object matching in videos (Sivic & Zisserman, 2003)
 Minimum Probability of Error Image Retrieval (Vasconcelos, 2004)
 On the Efficient Evaluation of Probabilistic Similarity Functions for Image Retrieval (Vasconcelos, 2004)
 Extending image retrieval systems with a thesaurus for shapes (Hove, 2004)
 Names and Faces in the News (Berg et al., 2004)
 Cortina: a system for large-scale, content-based web image retrieval (Quack et al., 2004)
 A new perspective on Visual Information Retrieval (Eidenberger 2004)
 Language-based Querying of Image Collections on the basis of an Extensible Ontology (Town and Sinclair, 2004)
 The PIBE Personalizable Image Browsing Engine (Bartolini, Ciaccia, and Patella, 2004)
 Costume: A New Feature for Automatic Video Content Indexing (Jaffre 2005)
 Automatic Face Recognition for Film Character Retrieval in Feature-Length Films (Arandjelovic & Zisserman, 2005)
 Meaningful Image Spaces (Rouw, 2005)
 Content-based Multimedia Information Retrieval: State of the Art and Challenges (Lew et al. 2006)
 Adaptively Browsing Image Databases with PIBE (Bartolini, Ciaccia, and Patella, 2006)
 Algorithm on which Retrievr (Flickr search) and imgSeek is based on (Jacobs, Finkelstein, Salesin)
 Imagination: Exploiting Link Analysis for Accurate Image Annotation (Bartolini and Ciaccia, 2007)
  Evaluating Use of Interfaces for Visual Query Specification. (Hove, 2007)
  From Pixels to Semantic Spaces: Advances in Content-Based Image Retrieval (Vasconcelos, 2007)
 Content-based Image Retrieval by Indexing Random Subwindows with Randomized Trees (Maree et al., 2007)
 Image Retrieval: Ideas, Influences, and Trends of the New Age (Datta et al., 2008)
 Real-Time Computerized Annotation of Pictures (Li and Wang, 2008)
 Query Processing Issues in Region-based Image Databases (Bartolini, Ciaccia, and Patella, 2010)
 Shiatsu: Semantic-based Hierarchical Automatic Tagging of Videos by Segmentation Using Cuts (Bartolini, Patella, and Romani, 2010)
 Efficient and Effective Similarity-based Video Retrieval (Bartolini and Romani, 2010)
 Multi-dimensional Keyword-based Image Annotation and Search (Bartolini and Ciaccia, 2010)
 The Windsurf Library for the Efficient Retrieval of Multimedia Hierarchical Data (Bartolini, Patella, and Stromei, 2011)
 "Pl@ntNet: Interactive plant identification based on social image data" (Joly, Alexis et al.)
 " Content based Image Retrieval (Tyagi Vipin, 2017)
 Superimage: Packing Semantic-Relevant Images for Indexing and Retrieval (Luo, Zhang, Huang, Gao, Tian, 2014)
 Indexing and searching 100M images with Map-Reduce'' (Moise, Shestakov, Gudmundsson, and Amsaleg, 2013)

External links
  - the original article
 IJMIR many CBIR-related articles 
 Search by Drawing
 Demonstration of a visual search engine for images. (Search by example image or colors)

Applications of computer vision
Applications of artificial intelligence
Image search